Tomáš Zíb (born 31 January 1976), is a retired male tennis player from the Czech Republic. He reached a career-high singles ranking of World No. 51 in July 2005. Currently he is active conducting tennis lessons in Singapore.

ATP career finals

Doubles: 2 (1 title, 1 runner-up)

ATP Challenger and ITF Futures finals

Singles: 17 (8–9)

Doubles: 11 (4–7)

Performance timeline

Singles

External links
 
 
 
 Tomas Zib World Ranking History

1976 births
Czech male tennis players
Living people
Sportspeople from Písek
Tennis players from Prague